Ed Hayden (born October 24, 1983 in Olney, Maryland) is an American soccer player who last played for Pittsburgh Riverhounds in the USL Second Division.

Career

College
Hayden attended Magruder High School in Rockville, Maryland, played youth soccer with the Olney Metro-Stars and the Baltimore Bays, and played college soccer at Saint Francis University and Monmouth University. He was Monmouth’s Soccer MVP in 2004, and earned Second Team All-NEC in 2004, and First Team All NEC-in 2005.

Professional
Hayden turned professional in 2006 when he signed with the Richmond Kickers in the USL Second Division. He made his professional debut on April 23, 2006 in Richmond's opening day defeat to the Cincinnati Kings, but later helped them secure the 2006 USL2 regular season title.

After spending a year with the Atlantic City Diablos in the amateur National Premier Soccer League in 2007, Hayden returned to the professional ranks in 2008 with the Pittsburgh Riverhounds. On March 8, 2010 Pittsburgh announced the re-signing of Hayden to a new contract for the 2010 season.

References

External links
Riverhounds bio

1983 births
Living people
American soccer players
Pittsburgh Riverhounds SC players
Richmond Kickers players
Saint Francis University alumni
Monmouth Hawks men's soccer players
People from Olney, Maryland
Sportspeople from Rockville, Maryland
Soccer players from Maryland
Association football defenders